Mark Murphy (born April 19, 1984 in Clinton, Maryland) is an American professional soccer player currently playing for Crystal Palace Baltimore in the USSF Division 2 Professional League.

Career

Youth and College
Murphy attended DeMatha Catholic High School in Hyattsville, Maryland, being named all-conference WCAC First Team (2001), all-Prince George's County (2000, 2001) and All Metropolitan Area 1st Team by the Washington Post. He was later named to the All-Decade team by the Prince George's Gazette (2001) and played four years of college soccer at Mount St. Mary's University where he named to the all-NEC second team as a senior in 2006, and finished his career in his school's top five in saves (294), shutouts (11) and minutes played (5081).

During his college years Murphy also played with the Thunder Bay Chill, Reading Rage and Chesapeake Dragons in the USL Premier Development League. During his time with Chesapeake he occasionally played as a makeshift striker, scoring two goals in a game against West Virginia Chaos.

Professional
Having already undertaken trials in Europe with teams such as Slovan Liberec and Skonto Riga, Murphy turned professional in 2007 when he signed with the Richmond Kickers of the USL Second Division. He has been the Kickers regular reserve goalkeeper since then, acting as backup to first-choice stopper Ronnie Pascale, and has made just eight first team appearances in his four years with the club. He then went on to sign with Crystal Palace USA in the NASL/USSF Division 2 late in the 2010 season and appeared in 3 games.

Coaching
In addition to his playing career, Murphy is the goalkeeper coach for the University of Richmond men's college soccer team. His coaching experience includes serving as director of goalkeeping for the Richmond Kickers Youth Soccer Club, serving as a coach and goalkeeper instructor for the Rob Ryerson Professional Soccer Camps, a coach for the Top Flight Goalkeeper Academy and a coach for Sampson Soccer, a non-profit group operating in Washington, D.C.

References

External links
 Infosport player profile

1984 births
Living people
American soccer players
Chesapeake Dragons players
Reading United A.C. players
Thunder Bay Chill players
Richmond Kickers players
Crystal Palace Baltimore players
USL League Two players
USL Second Division players
USSF Division 2 Professional League players
Soccer players from Maryland
Association football forwards
Association football goalkeepers